Shkodër District (short name: Shkodër, variants: Rrethi Shkodër and Shkodra) was one of the 36 districts of Albania, which were dissolved in July 2000 and replaced by 12 newly created counties. It is in the north of the country, and its capital was the city of Shkodër. Its territory is now part of Shkodër County: the municipalities of Shkodër and Vau i Dejës.

Religion in Shkodër is 70% Muslim, 28% Catholic, 1% Orthodox and 1% undeclared. The area includes significant tourist attractions, such as Rozafa Castle (fortress of Shkodra); one of the biggest and most famous castles in Albania, with the 13–14th century St. Stephen's Church in its court, later converted to a mosque; the Ottoman-era Historical Museum building (1815); and the National Photo Gallery.

Administrative divisions
The district consisted of the following municipalities:

Ana e Malit
Bërdicë
Bushat
Dajç
Guri i Zi
Hajmel
Postribë
Pult
Rrethinat
Shalë
Shkodër
Shllak
Shosh
Temal
Vau i Dejës
Velipojë
Vig-Mnelë

References

Districts of Albania
Geography of Shkodër County